Swift is an unincorporated community in Roseau County, Minnesota, United States.

The community is located east-southeast of Warroad on State Highway 11 (MN 11).  Swift is located within Laona Township and Moranville Township.

Nearby places include Warroad, Roosevelt, Williams, and Lake of the Woods at Muskeg Bay.

References

 Rand McNally Road Atlas – 2007 edition – Minnesota entry
 Official State of Minnesota Highway Map – 2013/2014 edition

Unincorporated communities in Minnesota
Unincorporated communities in Roseau County, Minnesota